The 1994 Sonoma State Cossacks football team represented Sonoma State University as a member of the Northern California Athletic Conference (NCAC) during the 1994 NCAA Division II football season. Led by second-year head coach Frank Scalercio, Sonoma State compiled an overall record of 3–7 with a mark of 2–1 in conference play, sharing the NCAC title with Chico State and Humboldt State. The team was outscored by its opponents for to 193 for 202 the season. The Cossacks played home games at Cossacks Stadium in Rohnert Park, California.

Schedule

Notes

References

Sonoma State
Sonoma State Cossacks football seasons
Northern California Athletic Conference football champion seasons
Sonoma State Cossacks football